Christopher Armand Taylor Jr. (born August 29, 1990), nicknamed "CT3", is an American professional baseball utility player for the Los Angeles Dodgers of Major League Baseball (MLB). He previously played in MLB for the Seattle Mariners. He played college baseball for the Virginia Cavaliers. Taylor was selected in the fifth round of the 2012 MLB draft, and made his MLB debut with the Mariners in 2014. Traded to the Dodgers, Taylor won the National League Championship Series Most Valuable Player Award in 2017, was a member of the World Series champions in 2020, and was an All-Star in 2021.

Early life

Amateur career
Taylor attended Great Neck Middle School in Virginia Beach, Virginia, where he was on the wrestling team, and won a city wrestling championship. When he attended Frank W. Cox High School, also in Virginia Beach, he stopped wrestling to focus on baseball. He was named the All-Tidewater region player of the year in 2009.

Taylor was recruited to play college baseball by the University of Virginia and the College of William & Mary. He chose to attend Virginia, and played college baseball for the Virginia Cavaliers baseball team, competing in the Atlantic Coast Conference (ACC). In his freshman year, Taylor played sparingly as Tyler Cannon, an All-ACC shortstop, received most of the playing time. In the summer of 2010, he played for the Newport Gulls of the NECBL. In his sophomore year, Stephen Bruno was named the Cavaliers' starting shortstop at the beginning of the season, and Taylor began the year as the team's right fielder. Taylor became the starting shortstop when Bruno suffered a hamstring injury, and retained the job after Bruno recovered. In 2011, he hit a two-out, men on second and third single to score the tying and winning runs in the decisive game of the Charlottesville Super Regional against UC Irvine and send the Cavaliers to the College World Series. In 2011, he played collegiate summer baseball in the Cape Cod Baseball League for the Yarmouth-Dennis Red Sox.

Professional career

Minor leagues
The Seattle Mariners selected Taylor in the fifth round of the 2012 Major League Baseball draft. He began his professional career in Minor League Baseball at the Rookie level, but was soon promoted to Class A, primarily playing shortstop. In 2013, Taylor played for the High Desert Mavericks of the Class A-Advanced California League and Jackson Generals of the Class AA Southern League, finishing the season with a combined .314 batting average, 165 hits (eighth-best in Minor League Baseball), eight home runs, 60 runs batted in (RBIs), 108 runs scored, and 38 stolen bases while playing shortstop and second base. After the season, the Mariners assigned Taylor to the Peoria Javelinas of the Arizona Fall League, and named him their minor league player of the year. He hit .294 with Peoria, and had a .351 on-base percentage, while playing second base and shortstop.

Seattle Mariners
The Mariners invited Taylor to spring training in 2014. Following spring training, he was assigned to the Tacoma Rainers of the Class AAA Pacific Coast League (PCL). He appeared in the Triple-A All-Star Game, and was named the PCL's Top Star. After batting .328 with five home runs, 37 RBIs, and 63 runs scored in 75 games while playing shortstop and second base, the Mariners promoted Taylor to the major leagues on July 24 to replace the injured Willie Bloomquist who was placed on the 15-day disabled list, where he played shortstop, second base, and third base. He collected his first major-league hit, a single, on the same day against the Baltimore Orioles.

During spring training in 2015, Taylor fractured his wrist when he was hit by a pitch. After he recovered from his injury, he began the 2015 season with AAA Tacoma, playing shortstop and second base. He would have a stint with the Mariners later in the year, but was sent back to Tacoma after RHP Mayckol Guaipe was called up. For the 2015 major league season, he batted .170/.220/.223 with no home runs and one RBI in 94 at bats, while playing shortstop, second base, and third base. On May 21, 2016 Chris was recalled from AAA Tacoma to replace the injured Ketel Marte.

Los Angeles Dodgers
On June 19, 2016, the Mariners traded Taylor to the Los Angeles Dodgers in exchange for Zach Lee. Seattle Mariners General Manager Jerry Dipoto would later regret making this trade by calling it "clearly the worst deal I've ever made."

On July 15, 2016, Taylor hit his first major league career home run, a grand slam, off Silvino Bracho of the Arizona Diamondbacks. He also had a double, a triple, drove in six runs, and fell just short of hitting for the cycle. He was the third Dodgers player in history to have his first career homer be a grand slam (Preston Ward in 1948 and Chico Fernández in 1956) and the third Dodgers second baseman to have at least six RBIs in a game (Billy Herman in 1943 and Jackie Robinson in 1949). He played in 34 games for the Dodgers in 2016, hitting .207/.258/362 with one home run and 7 RBIs, primarily playing shortstop.

2017 
Taylor did not make the club out of spring training in 2017, and was assigned to Oklahoma City to begin the season, for whom he batted .233/.327/.442 with one home run and 5 RBIs in 43 at bats. He was recalled to the Dodgers on April 19.  On July 6, against the Arizona Diamondbacks, Taylor hit his first career walk-off hit, driving in Logan Forsythe to win the game 5-4. For the 2017 season, he batted .288/.354/.496 with 21 home runs and 72 RBIs and 142 strikeouts in 514 at bats, splitting time between center field, left field, second base, shortstop, and third base. 

On October 14, 2017, Taylor hit his first career postseason home run, off Héctor Rondón of the Chicago Cubs, in Game 1 of the 2017 National League Championship Series (NLCS). Taylor and Justin Turner were selected as the co-MVPs of the NLCS. On October 24, Taylor hit a home run on the first pitch by Astros' pitcher Dallas Keuchel to begin Game 1 of the 2017 World Series.  Overall, in the 2017 post-season, Taylor hit .254 with three home runs and seven RBI
in 15 games as the Dodgers controversially lost the World Series in seven games.

2018 
In his third season with the Dodgers, Taylor posted a .254/.331/.444 slashline with 17 home runs, 63 RBIs and 9 stolen bases in 604 plate appearances, and led the National League with 178 strikeouts. He reached career highs in games played (155), runs scored (85), doubles (35), triples (8), and walks (55). With teammate Corey Seager missing most of the season due to a right UCL strain, requiring Tommy John Surgery, Taylor spent the majority of the season at shortstop (81 games, 73 starts). He also played center field (50 games, 32 starts), left field (24 games, 18 starts), second base (12 games, 5 starts), and third base (8 games, 3 starts). On September 10, 2018, Taylor was selected to represent MLB in the 2018 MLB Japan All-Star Series.  In the post-season, Taylor had only one hit in four at-bats in the 2018 NLDS, but his hit was a homer. In the 2018 NLCS, he had eight hits in 22 at-bats and in the 2018 World Series, he had two hits in 18 at-bats.

2019
In 2019, Taylor returned to his utility role, playing in 124 games (which included 39 at shortstop during another period that Seager was on the injured list). He hit .262/.333/.462 with 12 homers and 52 RBIs, and 115 strikeouts in 366 at bats.

2020
On February 7, 2020, Taylor signed a two-year, $13.4 million, contract extension with the Dodgers,  avoiding salary arbitration. The season was shortened due to the COVID-19 pandemic, but Taylor was the Dodgers primary second baseman, appearing in 56 of the 60 games the team played, and batting .270/.366/.476 with eight homers and 32 RBIs. In the posteason, he had one hit in eight at-bats in the Wild Card Series, was hitless in 11 at-bats in the NLDS, had three hits in 18 at-bats in the NLCS and in the World Series had five hits, including a home run, in 23 at-bats. Taylor received his first championship ring, as the Dodgers defeated the Tampa Bay Rays 4–2 to win their first championship since 1988.

2021
Taylor was selected to represent the Dodgers at the All-Star Game, his first All-Star appearance. During the regular season, he batted .254/.344/.438 with 20 home runs, 73 RBIs and 13 stolen bases in 148 games. 

On October 6, 2021, Taylor hit a two-out, two-run, walk-off home run against the St. Louis Cardinals in the National League Wild Card game. On October 21, 2021, Taylor hit three home runs in Game 5 of the NLCS against the Atlanta Braves, becoming the first player in MLB history to hit three home runs in an elimination game.

On December 1, Taylor re-signed with the Dodgers with a four-year contract worth $60 million, which also contained a team option for a fifth year.

2022
In 2022, Taylor played in 118 games for he Dodgers (with the majority of them being in the outfield), and batted .221 with 10 homers and 43 RBIs.

Personal life
Taylor's father, Chris Sr., and grandfather, Armand, attended Virginia Tech, where they competed on the wrestling team.

References

External links

 

1990 births
Living people
Baseball players from Virginia
Clinton LumberKings players
Everett AquaSox players
High Desert Mavericks players
Jackson Generals (Southern League) players
Los Angeles Dodgers players
Major League Baseball center fielders
Major League Baseball left fielders
Major League Baseball second basemen
Major League Baseball shortstops
Major League Baseball third basemen
National League Championship Series MVPs
Oklahoma City Dodgers players
Peoria Javelinas players
Seattle Mariners players
Sportspeople from Virginia Beach, Virginia
Tacoma Rainiers players
Virginia Cavaliers baseball players
Yarmouth–Dennis Red Sox players
Rancho Cucamonga Quakes players